The exponential function is a mathematical function denoted by  or  (where the argument  is written as an exponent).  Unless otherwise specified, the term generally refers to the positive-valued function of a real variable, although it can be extended to the complex numbers or generalized to other mathematical objects like matrices or Lie algebras.  The exponential function originated from the notion of exponentiation (repeated multiplication), but modern definitions (there are several equivalent characterizations) allow it to be rigorously extended to all real arguments, including irrational numbers. Its ubiquitous occurrence in pure and applied mathematics led mathematician Walter Rudin to opine that the exponential function is "the most important function in mathematics". 

The exponential function satisfies the exponentiation identity 

which, along with the definition , shows that  for positive integers , and relates the exponential function to the elementary notion of exponentiation. The base of the exponential function, its value at 1, is a ubiquitous mathematical constant called Euler's number.  

The relation  for positive  and real or complex  establishes a strong relationship between these functions, which explains this ambiguous terminology.

The real exponential function can also be defined as a power series.  This power series definition is readily extended to complex arguments to allow the complex exponential function  to be defined.  The complex exponential function takes on all complex values except for 0 and is closely related to the complex trigonometric functions, as shown by Euler's formula. 

Motivated by more abstract properties and characterizations of the exponential function, the exponential can be generalized to and defined for entirely different kinds of mathematical objects (for example, a square matrix or a Lie algebra).

In applied settings, exponential functions model a relationship in which a constant change in the independent variable gives the same proportional change (that is, percentage increase or decrease) in the dependent variable. This occurs widely in the natural and social sciences, as in a self-reproducing population, a fund accruing compound interest, or a growing body of manufacturing expertise. Thus, the exponential function also appears in a variety of contexts within physics, computer science, chemistry, engineering, mathematical biology, and economics. 

Its inverse function is the natural logarithm, denoted    or  because of this, some old texts refer to the exponential function as the antilogarithm.

Graph
The graph always lies above the -axis, but becomes arbitrarily close to it for large negative ; thus, the -axis is a horizontal asymptote. The equation  means that the slope of the tangent to the graph at each point is equal to its -coordinate at that point.

Relation to more general exponential functions
The exponential function  is sometimes called the natural exponential function for distinguishing it from the other exponential functions. The study of any exponential function can easily be reduced to that of the natural exponential function, since per definition, for positive ,

As functions of a real variable, exponential functions are uniquely characterized by the fact that the derivative of such a function is directly proportional to the value of the function. The constant of proportionality of this relationship is the natural logarithm of the base :

Euler's number  is the unique base for which the constant of proportionality is 1, since , so that the function is its own derivative:

The natural exponential is hence denoted by
 or 

The former notation is commonly used for simpler exponents, while the latter is preferred when the exponent is a complicated expression.

Formal definition

The real exponential function  can be characterized in a variety of equivalent ways. It is commonly defined by the following power series:

The constant  can then be defined as 

satisfying the initial condition 

By way of the binomial theorem and the power series definition, the exponential function can also be defined as the following limit:

It can be shown that every continuous, nonzero solution of the functional equation  is an exponential function,  with

Overview

The exponential function arises whenever a quantity grows or decays at a rate proportional to its current value.  One such situation is continuously compounded interest, and in fact it was this observation that led Jacob Bernoulli in 1683 to the number

Later, in 1697, Johann Bernoulli studied the calculus of the exponential function.

If instead interest is compounded daily, this becomes . Letting the number of time intervals per year grow without bound leads to the limit definition of the exponential function,

first given by Leonhard Euler.
This is one of a number of characterizations of the exponential function; others involve series or differential equations.

From any of these definitions it can be shown that the exponential function obeys the basic exponentiation identity,

The derivative (rate of change) of the exponential function is the exponential function itself. More generally, a function with a rate of change proportional to the function itself (rather than equal to it) is expressible in terms of the exponential function. This function property leads to exponential growth or exponential decay.

The exponential function extends to an entire function on the complex plane. Euler's formula relates its values at purely imaginary arguments to trigonometric functions.  The exponential function also has analogues for which the argument is a matrix, or even an element of a Banach algebra or a Lie algebra.

Derivatives and differential equations

The importance of the exponential function in mathematics and the sciences stems mainly from its property as the unique function which is equal to its derivative and is equal to 1 when . That is,

Functions of the form  for constant  are the only functions that are equal to their derivative (by the Picard–Lindelöf theorem). Other ways of saying the same thing include:
 The slope of the graph at any point is the height of the function at that point.
 The function solves the differential equation .
  is a fixed point of derivative as a functional.

If a variable's growth or decay rate is proportional to its size—as is the case in unlimited population growth (see Malthusian catastrophe), continuously compounded interest, or radioactive decay—then the variable can be written as a constant times an exponential function of time.  Explicitly for any real constant , a function  satisfies  if and only if  for some constant . The constant k is called the decay constant, disintegration constant, rate constant, or transformation constant.

Furthermore, for any differentiable function , we find, by the chain rule:

Continued fractions for 
A continued fraction for  can be obtained via an identity of Euler:

The following generalized continued fraction for  converges more quickly:

or, by applying the substitution :

with a special case for :

For example:

Complex plane

As in the real case, the exponential function can be defined on the complex plane in several equivalent forms. The most common definition of the complex exponential function parallels the power series definition for real arguments, where the real variable is replaced by a complex one:

Alternatively, the complex exponential function may be defined by modelling the limit definition for real arguments, but with the real variable replaced by a complex one:

For the power series definition, term-wise multiplication of two copies of this power series in the Cauchy sense, permitted by Mertens' theorem, shows that the defining multiplicative property of exponential functions continues to hold for all complex arguments:

The definition of the complex exponential function in turn leads to the appropriate definitions extending the trigonometric functions to complex arguments.

In particular, when  ( real), the series definition yields the expansion

In this expansion, the rearrangement of the terms into real and imaginary parts is justified by the absolute convergence of the series.

for all 

These definitions for the exponential and trigonometric functions lead trivially to Euler's formula:

We could alternatively define the complex exponential function based on this relationship.

For , the relationship  holds, so that  for real  and  maps the real line (mod ) to the unit circle in the complex plane.

Based on these observations and the fact that the measure of an angle in radians is the arc length on the unit circle subtended by the angle, it is easy to see that, restricted to real arguments, the sine and cosine functions as defined above coincide with the sine and cosine functions as introduced in elementary mathematics via geometric notions.

The complex exponential function is periodic with period  and  holds for all .

When its domain is extended from the real line to the complex plane, the exponential function retains the following properties:

for all 

Extending the natural logarithm to complex arguments yields the complex logarithm , which is a multivalued function.

We can then define a more general exponentiation:

This is also a multivalued function, even when  is real. The rule about multiplying exponents for the case of positive real numbers must be modified in a multivalued context:

See failure of power and logarithm identities for more about problems with combining powers.

The exponential function maps any line in the complex plane to a logarithmic spiral in the complex plane with the center at the origin. Two special cases exist: when the original line is parallel to the real axis, the resulting spiral never closes in on itself; when the original line is parallel to the imaginary axis, the resulting spiral is a circle of some radius.

Considering the complex exponential function as a function involving four real variables:

the graph of the exponential function is a two-dimensional surface curving through four dimensions.

Starting with a color-coded portion of the  domain, the following are depictions of the graph as variously projected into two or three dimensions.

The second image shows how the domain complex plane is mapped into the range complex plane:
 zero is mapped to 1
 the real  axis is mapped to the positive real  axis
 the imaginary  axis is wrapped around the unit circle at a constant angular rate
 values with negative real parts are mapped inside the unit circle
 values with positive real parts are mapped outside of the unit circle
 values with a constant real part are mapped to circles centered at zero
 values with a constant imaginary part are mapped to rays extending from zero

The third and fourth images show how the graph in the second image extends into one of the other two dimensions not shown in the second image.

The third image shows the graph extended along the real  axis.  It shows the graph is a surface of revolution about the  axis of the graph of the real exponential function, producing a horn or funnel shape.

The fourth image shows the graph extended along the imaginary  axis. It shows that the graph's surface for positive and negative  values doesn't really meet along the negative real  axis, but instead forms a spiral surface about the  axis.

Complex exponentiation  can be defined by converting  to polar coordinates and using the identity :

However, when  is not an integer, this function is multivalued, because  is not unique (see failure of power and logarithm identities).

Matrices and Banach algebras
The power series definition of the exponential function makes sense for square matrices (for which the function is called the matrix exponential) and more generally in any unital Banach algebra .

Some alternative definitions lead to the same function.  For instance,  can be defined as

Lie algebras
Given a Lie group  and its associated Lie algebra , the exponential map is a map   satisfying similar properties. In fact, since  is the Lie algebra of the Lie group of all positive real numbers under multiplication, the ordinary exponential function for real arguments is a special case of the Lie algebra situation. Similarly, since the Lie group  of invertible  matrices has as Lie algebra , the space of all  matrices, the exponential function for square matrices is a special case of the Lie algebra exponential map.

The identity  can fail for Lie algebra elements  and  that do not commute; the Baker–Campbell–Hausdorff formula supplies the necessary correction terms.

Transcendency

Computation
When computing (an approximation of) the exponential function near the argument , the result will be close to 1, and computing the value of the difference  with floating-point arithmetic may lead to the loss of (possibly all) significant figures, producing a large calculation error, possibly even a meaningless result.

For example, if the exponential is computed by using its Taylor series

one may use the Taylor series of :

This was first implemented in 1979 in the Hewlett-Packard HP-41C calculator, and provided by several calculators, operating systems (for example Berkeley UNIX 4.3BSD), computer algebra systems, and programming languages (for example C99).

A similar approach has been used for the logarithm (see lnp1).

An identity in terms of the hyperbolic tangent,

See also

 Carlitz exponential, a characteristic  analogue
 
 
 Gaussian function
 Half-exponential function, a compositional square root of an exponential function
 List of exponential topics
 List of integrals of exponential functions
 Mittag-Leffler function, a generalization of the exponential function
 -adic exponential function
 Padé table for exponential function – Padé approximation of exponential function by a fraction of polynomial functions

Notes

References

External links
 

Elementary special functions
Analytic functions
Exponentials
Special hypergeometric functions
E (mathematical constant)